Pyotr Ilyich Kosarevsky (born 11 May 1999) is a Russian football player who plays for FC Veles Moscow.

Club career
He made his debut in the Russian Football National League for FC Veles Moscow on 9 September 2020 in a game against FC Krasnodar-2.

References

External links
 
 Profile by Russian Football National League
 

1999 births
Footballers from Moscow
Living people
Russian footballers
Russia youth international footballers
Association football goalkeepers
FC Dynamo Moscow reserves players
FC Veles Moscow players
Russian Second League players
Russian First League players